Lavar (also Romanized as Lāvar; also known as Lavar Shikh) is a village in Kukherd Rural District, Kukherd District, Bastak County, Hormozgan Province, Iran. At the 2006 census, its population was 544, in 115 families.

References

External links 

  Kookherd Website.

Populated places in Bastak County
Kukherd District